The phrase covenant of salt appears twice in the Hebrew Bible:

In the Book of Numbers, God's covenant with the Aaronic priesthood is said to be a covenant of salt. In the second book of Chronicles, God's covenant with the Davidic kings of Israel is also described as a covenant of salt. According to the New Oxford Annotated Bible, "of salt" most likely means that the covenant is "a perpetual covenant, because of the use of salt as a preservative".

The commandments regarding grain offerings in the Book of Leviticus state "every offering of your grain offering you shall season with salt; you shall not allow the salt of the covenant of your God to be lacking from your grain offering. With all your offerings you shall offer salt."

See also
 Bread and salt

References

Covenants in the Hebrew Bible
Book of Leviticus
Book of Numbers
Books of Chronicles